Battle Shark (バトルシャーク) is a first person shoot 'em up arcade game released in 1989 by Taito. The player looks through a submarine periscope in order to destroy enemies, featuring simulated damage whenever the player gets hit by either an enemy torpedo or a missile.

The player starts off with a limited amount of torpedoes, which slowly replenishes itself, so players must shoot accurately. Power-up targets appear throughout the games, which can increase the player's supply of torpedoes, repairs damage or add extra firepower in addition to the torpedoes. At the end of each stage, the player faces off against a Boss character.

The Amusement & Music Operators Association (AMOA) nominated Battle Shark for the "Most Inventive" award in 1990. The game was released for Taito Legends in 2005.

Plot

The story in Battle Shark involves a third world war (World War 3 or WWIII). According to the description in the game's attract mode introduction, "extremely brutal fighting has been taking place on land, and now the battlefield is expanding into the oceans."

Peace negotiations, the fictional allies then discover, are an enemy trap, and that the enemy has actually been buying time to create an underwater fortress at the bottom of the sea.

Battle Shark, with its driver, a navy soldier, must fight its way through hordes of enemy submarines, boats, and vehicles to track down the fortress, and ultimately destroy it.

Reception 
In Japan, Game Machine listed Battle Shark on their May 1, 1990 issue as being the sixth most-successful upright arcade unit of the month.

The game was well-received by critics. RePlay gave it a positive review upon its North American debut at Chicago's American Coin Machine Exposition (ACME) in March 1990. Your Sinclair reviewed the arcade game in 1990, giving it an 87% score.

At the 1990 AMOA Games Awards held by the Amusement & Music Operators Association (AMOA), Battle Shark was nominated for the "Most Inventive" award.

References

1989 video games
Arcade video games
Naval video games
Rail shooters
Submarine simulation video games
Taito arcade games
Taito Z System games
World War III video games
Video games developed in Japan